Beykent University is a foundation university in Istanbul, Turkey, teaching in English, Russian combined and Turkish with 29,401 students.

Beykent University has agreements with European universities under the Socrates and Erasmus programmes, which allow university students to continue their education in a European university and foreign students to study in Turkey.

Ahmet Davutoğlu, the former Prime Minister of Turkey, worked at Beykent University as a professor from 1999 to 2004, serving as Head of the Department of International Relations, Member of University Senate and Member of Board of Management.

Ömer Dinçer, the former Minister of National Education of Turkey, worked at Beykent University as a professor from 1999 to 2003, serving as Dean of the Faculty of Economics and Administrative Sciences, Director of Institute of Social Sciences and Vice Chancellor.

Beykent University Men's Volleyball Team has become the champion in the first League Volleyball Tournament organized on March 18–29, 2013 by the Turkish University Sports Federation.

History 
Beykent University is a foundation university having the public legal entity status which was founded by Adem Çelik - Beykent Educational Foundation on 09.07.1997 under the Law No. 4282.

Believing that education is the only solution for the unsolved problems of the increasingly growing and developing modern Turkey, our founder Adem Çelik has taken initiatives in the field of education with the ideal of “serving the community”, and created a flawless chain of education from kindergarten to primary and high school followed by Beykent University.

The university, which began its educational journey on Büyükçekmece Campus in the Academic Year 1997 – 1998, offers education on four highly equipped campuses located in central districts of İstanbul.

Academics 

Faculty of Science and Literature
 English Language and Literature 
 History 
 Psychology 
 Sociology 
 Translation and Interpreting (English) 
 Translation and Interpreting (Russian) 
 Turkish Language and Literature

Faculty of Economics and Administrative Sciences
 Banking and Finance
 Business Administration
 Economics
 International Relations
 International Logistics and Transportation
 International Trade
 Management Information Systems
 Tourism Management
 Political Science and Public Administration

Faculty of Engineering and Architecture
 Architecture 
 Chemical Engineering 
 Civil Engineering
 Computer Engineering
 Electronics and Communication Engineering
 Energy System Engineering
 Industrial Engineering 
 Interior Architecture 
 Management Engineering
 Mechanical Engineering 
 Software Engineering

Faculty of Law
 Law

Faculty of Fine Arts
 Acting
 Art Management and Performing Arts
 Cinema and TV
 Communication and Design
 Graphic Design
 Textile and Design

Faculty of Communication
 New Media
 Public Relations and Advertising
 Television Reporting and Programming
 Visual Communication

Faculty of Medicine
 Medicine

Faculty of Dentistry
 Dentistry

School of Applied Sciences
 Capital Market and Portfolio Management
 Gastronomy and Culinary Arts 
 Industrial Design

School of Foreign Languages
 Foreign Language Preparatory Department

School of Health Services
 Child Development
 Social Services
 Audiology
 Nursing

Vocational School

Associate (Pre-Bachelor's) Degree
 Anaesthesia
 Applied English and Translation
 Applied Russian and Translation
 Architectural Restoration
 Audiometry
 Banking and Insurance
 Business Administration
 Cooking
 Child Development
 Computer Programming
 Construction Technology
 Dental Prosthesis Technology
 Dialysis
 Electroneurophysiology
 Fashion Design
 First Aid and Emergency
 Foreign Trade
 Graphic Design
 Health Establishments Administration
 Human Resources Management
 Justice
 Logistics
 Machinery
 Medical Documentation and Secretary
 Medical Documentation Techniques
 Medical Laboratory Techniques
 Medical Publicity and Marketing
 Opticianry
 Oral And Dental Health
 First Aid and Emergency
 Pathology Laboratory Techniques
 Physiotheraphy
 Printing and Broadcasting Technologies
 Public Relations and Publicity
 Radio and Television Programming
 Radiotherapy
 Surgical Services
 Textile Technology
 Tourism and Travel Services
 Worker's Health and Safety

Institute of Social Sciences

Department of Business Administration (MBA)
 Accounting
 Management
 Business Administration
 Fashion Management
 Finance
 Global Marketing
 Hospital and Health Institutions Management
 Human Resources and Organizational Change
 International Economy Politics and Business
 International Management
 Management Information Systems
 Management Organization
 Marketing
 Numerical Methods
 Production Management and Industrial Management
 Production Management and Marketing
 Public Relations and Advertising
 Real Estate Valuation And Financing
 Strategic Business Administration
 Tourism Management

Department of Psychology (MA)
Clinical Psychology

Department of Economics (MA)
 Political Economy

Department of Law
 Public Law

Department of International Relations (MA)
 International Relations

Department of English Language and Literature (MA)
 English Language and Literature

Department of History
 History

Art Department of Cinema and TV (MA)
 Cinema and TV

Art Department of Communication and Design (MA)
 Communication Arts and Design

Art Department of Textile and Fashion Design (MA)
 Textile and Fashion Design

Institute of Science and Engineering

Department of Mathematics and Computing (MSc)
 Applied Mathematics
 Computer Networks and Internet Technologies
 Decision Analysis and Strategy Development
 Information Technologies

Department of Computer Engineering (MSc)
 Computer Engineering

Department of Industrial Engineering (MSc)
 Industrial Engineering

Department of Architecture (MSc)
 Architectural Design
 Architecture
 Construction Technology
 Urban Design

Department of Machine Engineering (MSc)
 Machine Engineering

Department of Construction Engineering (MSc)
 Design and Production Management
 Earthquake Risk Constructions and Urban Transformation

Department of Interior Architecture (MSc)
 Interior Architecture

Doctorate – Competence in Art

Institute of Social Sciences

 Art and Design (Competence in Art)
 Business Administration (Doctorate)
 Cinema TV (Competence in Art)
 Political Science and International Relations (Doctorate)

Institute of Science and Engineering
 Applied Mathematics
 Architecture
 Computer Engineering

Distance Learning

Institute of Social Sciences
 Banking and Finance (Distance Learning)
 Hospital and Health Institutions Management (Distance Learning)
 Human Resources and Organizational Change (Distance Learning)
 Management (Distance Learning) (e-MBA)
 Management Information Systems (Distance Learning)

Institute of Science and Engineering
 Urban Management and Geographical Information System

Campuses
Campuses include:
 Ayazağa - Maslak Campus - Sarıyer
 Büyükçekmece Campus - Büyükçekmece
 Büyükçekmece Campus - Yeni Bina - Esenyurt
 Taksim Campus - Taksim, Beyoğlu

Beylikdüzü Campus
The Beykent Büyükçekmece Beylikdüzü Campus is located at Istanbul's Büyükçekmece county within the residential area of Beykent. The 12 floor building is centered around the Beylikdüzü life center, healthcare institutions and the Tüyap Exhibition.

The 16.000 m2 closed educational complex provides modern educational facilities, laboratories, workshop studios, an auditorium, and a cultural center. The external sports area and swimming pool at the Beykent College can be used by the students of the university.

The facility houses mainly the Vocational School, which runs 38 programmes, 23 in the daytime and 15 in the evening for the benefit of working students. The Vocational School opened its doors for the 2005-2006 teaching year.

Also the newly opened Communications Faculty will be housed within this building, starting teaching in the 2008–2009 academic year.

Ayazağa-Maslak Campus
The Ayazaga-Maslak Campus is in the Sarıyer region of Istanbul. This modern building opened with an 8,000 student capacity for the 2005-2006 lecture year. It provides facilities mainly for BA and BSc programmes as well as for the Turkish youth series Hepsi 1.

In 2011 the Ayazaga-Maslak Campus has a maximum 12,000 student capacity because of new building improvements.

Taksim Campus 
Located within Istanbul's main culture and arts district, the 5000 m2 building was opened in 2004. It serves as the headquarters of the Social Sciences Institute and most post-graduate programmes are taught in this building. The Law Faculty is located in this building and began teaching in the 2008–2009 academic year.

Also in 2008-2009 the Taksim Campus began to offer its Distance Learning Programme for two, 2-year programmes. The building is also the headquarters for the Beykent University Atatürk Research and Applied Sciences Center and the Beykent University Strategic Research Center

Affiliations
The university is a member of the Caucasus University Association.

See also 
 List of universities in Turkey

References

External links 
 

 
Educational institutions established in 1997
Private universities and colleges in Turkey
Beyoğlu
1997 establishments in Turkey